Mohamed Nofel (born 15 November 1984) is an Egyptian rower. He competed in the men's lightweight double sculls event at the 2012 Summer Olympics.

References

1984 births
Living people
Egyptian male rowers
Olympic rowers of Egypt
Rowers at the 2012 Summer Olympics
People from El Mahalla El Kubra